|}
John Derek Bailey (born 10 August 1954) is a former Australian politician. He was the Labor member for Wanguri in the Northern Territory Legislative Assembly from 1989 to 1999. Bailey was Deputy Opposition Leader to Maggie Hickey, but was succeeded by Syd Stirling when Clare Martin became Labor leader. He resigned shortly afterwards, in 1999.

References

1954 births
Living people
Members of the Northern Territory Legislative Assembly
Australian Labor Party members of the Northern Territory Legislative Assembly